Belarusian vehicle registration plates are currently composed of four digits, two letters and another digit (e.g. 1234 AB-5). The first of the letters and the final digit indicate the region of Belarus in which the car was registered. 

Vehicles owned by foreign companies use black-on-yellow plates, and the numbers and letters appear in a different order (e.g. M  1223).

The diplomatic series uses white letters on a red background, also in a different order from standard plates (e.g. CD 1234-5).

History
Soviet-era registration plates for Belarus carried a pair of two-digit numbers followed by letters in Cyrillic (e.g. 12 34 MББ). Following independence in 1992, the format of Belarusian registration plates became red characters — four digits and two letters on a white background — with the national crest in the centre, separating the digits from the letters

TX used on registered vehicles driven in foreign countries.

Car registration
The letters used on Belarusian registration plates today are confined to those appearing in both the Cyrillic and Latin alphabets.

On current Belarusian registration plates, the first letter, as well as the final digit*, indicates where the car was registered: 

 1 - Brest Region
 2 - Vitebsk Region 
 3 - Gomel Region 
 4 - Grodno Region
 5 - Minsk Region
 6 - Mogilev Region
 7 - Minsk (city) 

In the case of the letters, it is the first letter that indicates the region in which the car was registered, the second being taken from the series A, B, C, E, I, K, M, H, P, O, T, X:
 
 A Brest
 B Vitebsk
 C Grodno
 E Gomel
 HA, HB, HC, HE, HH, HI, HM, HO, HP, HT, HX Gomel
 HK Minsk
 IA, IB, IC, IE, IH, II Brest
 IK, IM, IO, IT, IX Vitebsk
 IP Minsk (city)
 K, M Minsk (city)
 O, P Minsk (region)
 T Mogilev
 XA, XB, XC, XE, XH, XI Grodno
 XK Minsk (city)
 XM, XO, XP, XT, XX Mogilev

Special plates 
D1 2345 - Diplomatic or consular corps
K - Foreign correspondents
M - Vehicle belonging to embassies, consulates, international organizations, banks and companies, foreign persons without citizenship. (Note that these kind of registration plates have black characters on a yellow background)
Motorcycles and tractors typically have smaller registration plates.
The order of characters for truck registrations is: one letter, four digits, a second letter, and a final digit (e.g. A 1234A-5).

External links
 
 Olavsplates.com
 Demon.co.uk Where in Belarus does that vehicle come from? 
 Pl8s.com Current Belarusian licence plates
 PlatesMania.com A gallery of Belarusian license plates 

Road transport in Belarus
Belarus
Belarus transport-related lists
 Registration plates